Caroline Müller may refer to:

 Caroline Müller (1755–1826) (1755–1826), Danish / Swedish singer
 Caroline Müller (footballer) (born 1989), Swiss football striker
 Caroline Müller, pop singer, known as C. C. Catch